Mu Tunç (born August 21, 1986) is a Turkish director, writer, film producer, and actor. His directing work includes feature films, digital web-series, commercials, and music videos. Tunç received international recognition in 2018 for directing the teen drama Arada, which has been seen as one of the first punk films of Turkey.

Early life and education 
Tunç was born in Istanbul, Turkey. His father, Altan Tunç, was a singer in the '70s. His brother Orkun Tunç (ex. member of Turkish punk band Rashit) is a musician and music producer who is one of the pioneer members of the first punk hardcore bands in Istanbul. He graduated from Design with an M.A. in Cinema.

Career

Advertising 
Tunç began his career in digital advertisement and marketing before directing his feature films. After graduating from Design, Tunç started working on international digital agencies such as; McCann, and he led the creative process of several advertising and marketing campaigns, including brands like Coca-Cola, L'Oreal, MasterCard, Starbucks, and many other international brands.

Branding 
Tunç also concentrated in the field of brand management. In 2012, he worked on the global streaming service company MUBI as a brand director and assisted them in developing their "one-film-per-day" subscription model. Tunç launched the LomoKino camera on Cannes Film Festival, which Apichatpong Weerasethakul shot an experimental short film titled Ashes with the camera. In 2016, Tunç worked with high-end streetwear brand Les Benjamins and assisted them in constructing their brand identity. He empowered them to present their Milan Menswear debut show Ottoman Punk in Milan Fashion Week together with former fashion editor of L'Uomo Vogue, Robert Rabensteiner. Vogue called the presentation an "unexpected highlight of the season."

Web series 
Tunç began his directing career as an independent filmmaker in 2010 with his online series called Diary of Mu. The project portrays naturalistic conversations that happen in real places with artists and creators from all around the world. Tunç started the project in Paris and shot a variety of artists such as; André Saraiva, Roisin Murphy, Asia Argento, Melissa George, Francesco Carrozzoni, Tracey Emin, Dario Argento, and many more.

Feature films 
Tunç made his feature film debut in 2018 with Arada, which he wrote and directed. The story set in 90's Istanbul and chronicles a young punk who decides to move to California in pursuit of a successful music career and sets on a journey through Istanbul's underworlds in search of a ticket. The film was based on Tunç's childhood years spent filming his brother's gigs and recording Istanbul's music subcultures.

Arada opened nationwide on April 13, 2018, in 81 theaters and premiered in international film festivals and museums. The film gained cult popularity by being one of the first punk films in Turkey. According to Joseph Pomp; "Arada offers a full-blown survey of the tensions between globalist liberalism and traditional values that, to this day, constitute the pulse of Istanbul."

Music videos 
Tunç directed a variety of music videos for acclaimed artists from New York to London to Reykjavik to Tel Aviv. He directed a music video for Randall Dunn's first solo studio album titled Beloved for the song "A True Home", featuring as guest vocal Zola Jesus which premiered on NPR in 2018.

In 2019, Tunç worked with American musician Alex Toth (known from Brooklyn band Rubblebucket) and shot a music video for his song "When I Awoke," which influenced by Tarkovsky's sci-fi film Stalker. He worked with Israeli artist Liraz Charhi for her solo record and shot her music video for the song titled "Zan Bezan".

In 2020, Tunç directed a music video for acclaimed Icelandic singer Gyða Valtýsdóttir for the song "Í Annarri Vídd" from her solo album Evolution which premiered on Vogue Italia.

Influences 
Tunç stated in his interviews that he influenced by; John Cassavetes, Michael Mann, F. W. Murnau, Nicholas Ray, Luis Buñuel, Kevin Smith, Spike Lee, and Richard Linklater and early 80's Los Angeles and Washington D.C. punk bands.

Accolades 
 Cinedays Skopje Film Festival: Winner Young Cinema Award (2018) 
 International Izmir Film Festival: Winner Special Award (2019) 
 Rome Independent Film Festival: Nominee RIFF Jury Award for Best Film (2018) 
 !f 17th Istanbul Independent Film Festival: Nominee !f New Audience Award (2018)

References

Further reading

Books 
 Özdemir, Gülçin, Berceste (2019) Türkiye'de Bağımsız Sinemaya Dair Tartışmalar Istanbul. Nobel Bilimsel Eserler  .

External links 
 Mu Tunç on IMDb
 MAD Museum of Arts & Design / New York - Global Punk Film Series

1986 births
Punk filmmakers
Mass media people from Istanbul
Living people